Between 1948 and 1972, Ceylon was an independent country in the Commonwealth of Nations, that shared a monarch with other dominions of the Commonwealth. In 1948, the British Colony of Ceylon was granted independence as Ceylon. In 1972, the country became a republic within the Commonwealth, and its name was changed to Sri Lanka.

History

Independence and growth 

Following the Second World War, public pressure for independence increased. The British-ruled Colony of Ceylon achieved independence on 4 February 1948, with an amended constitution taking effect on the same date. Independence was granted under the Ceylon Independence Act 1947. Military treaties with the United Kingdom preserved intact British air and sea bases in the country; British officers also continued to fill most of the upper ranks of the Ceylon Army. Don Senanayake became the first Prime Minister of Ceylon. Later in 1948, when Ceylon applied for United Nations membership, the Soviet Union vetoed the application. This was partly because the Soviet Union believed that the Ceylon was only nominally independent, and the British still exercised control over it because the white, educated elite had control of the government. In 1949, with the concurrence of the leaders of the Sri Lankan Tamils, the UNP government disenfranchised the Indian Tamil plantation workers. In 1950, Ceylon became one of the original members of the Colombo Plan, and remains a member as Sri Lanka.

Don Senanayake died in 1952 after a stroke and he was succeeded by his son Dudley. However, in 1953 – following a massive general strike or 'Hartal' by the leftist parties against the UNP – Dudley Senanayake resigned. He was followed by General Sir John L. Kotelawala, a senior politician and military commander and an uncle of Dudley. Kotelawala did not have the personal prestige or the political acumen of D. S. Senanayake. He brought to the fore the issue of national languages that D. S. Senanayake had suspended. Elizabeth II, Queen of Ceylon, toured the island in 1954 from 10 to 21 April (She also visited in 1981 from 21 to 25 October after the country became a republic.).

In 1956 the UNP was defeated at elections by the Mahajana Eksath Peramuna, which included the Sri Lanka Freedom Party (SLFP) led by Solomon Bandaranaike and the Viplavakari Lanka Sama Samaja Party of Philip Gunawardena. Bandaranaike was a politician who had fostered the Sinhalese nationalist lobby since the 1930s. He replaced English with Sinhala as the official language. He was the chief Sinhalese spokesman who attempted to counter the communal politics unleashed by G. G. Ponnambalam. The bill was known as the Sinhala Only Bill, and also made Sinhala the language taught in schools and universities. This caused Tamil riots, as they spoke the Tamil language and it had not been recognised as an official language. These riots culminated in the assassination of the prime minister, Bandaranaike. His widow, Sirimavo, succeeded her husband as leader of the SLFP and was elected as the world's first female prime minister. In 1957 British bases were removed and Ceylon officially became a "non-aligned" country. The Paddy Lands Act, the brainchild of Philip Gunawardena, was passed, giving those working the land greater rights vis-à-vis absentee landlords.

Reform 
Elections in July saw Sirimavo Bandaranaike become the world's first elected female head of government. Her government avoided further confrontations with the Tamils, but the anti-communist policies of the United States Government led to a cut-off of United States aid and a growing economic crisis. After an attempted coup d'état by mainly non-Buddhist right-wing army and police officers intent on bringing the UNP back to power, Bandaranaike nationalised the oil companies. This led to a boycott of the country by the oil cartels, which was broken with aid from the Kansas Oil Producers Co-operative.

In 1962, under the SLFP government, many Western business assets were nationalised. This caused disputes with the United States and the United Kingdom over compensation for seized assets. Such policies led to a temporary decline in SLFP power, and the UNP gained seats in Congress. However, by 1970, the SLFP were once again the dominant power.

In 1964 Bandaranaike formed a coalition government with the LSSP, a Trotskyist party with Dr N.M. Perera as Minister of Finance. Nonetheless, after Sirimavo failed to satisfy the far-left, the Marxist People's Liberation Front attempted to overthrow the government in 1971.

The rebellion was put down with the help of British, Soviet, and Indian aid in 1972, and later in 1972 became a republic and the name of the country was changed to Sri Lanka. In 1972, the country officially became a republic within the Commonwealth and William Gopallawa became the first President of Sri Lanka.

Government and politics 

The constitution of Ceylon created a parliamentary democracy with a bicameral legislature consisting of a Senate and a House of Representatives, with the popularly elected House indirectly naming the Senate. The head of state was the British monarch, represented in the country by the Governor General. The head of government was the prime minister, and he/she and his/her cabinet consisted of the largest political party in the legislature.

Initially, the prominent party was the UNP, the United National Party. In the first parliamentary elections, the UNP gained 42 out of the 95 seats available, and also won the elections in 1952. When the first prime minister, D. S. Senanayake, died of a stroke, his son Dudley Senanayake, the Minister of Agriculture, was appointed as prime minister. In 1956, the radical socialist SLFP (Sri Lanka Freedom Party) won the elections, and Solomon Bandaranaike took power. He was assassinated by a Buddhist monk in 1959 and his widow, Sirimavo, succeeded him as leader of the SLFP. She held office until 1977, with two exceptions in 1960 and 1965–1970, when the UNP held power. During her rule, she implemented a radical economic program of nationalisation and land reform, a pro-Sinhalese educational and employment policy, and an independent foreign policy as part of the non-aligned movement.

In 1948, when Ceylon achieved independence from the United Kingdom, the Governor was replaced with a Governor-General. The Governor-General was responsible not to London, but to the monarch of Ceylon, the local government, and the local parliament. The role was generally ceremonial, however it did come with the 'reserve powers' of the Crown which allowed the Governor General for example to dismiss the Prime Minister (with power such as this, the Governor General had to act as a responsible non-political 'referee' of the government, using the national constitution as the 'rulebook'). The monarch had the following styles and titles:

1948–1952: His Majesty George the Sixth, by the Grace of God, of Great Britain, Ireland and the British Dominions beyond the Seas King, Defender of the Faith.
1952–1953: Her Majesty Elizabeth the Second, by the Grace of God, of Great Britain, Ireland and the British Dominions beyond the Seas Queen, Defender of the Faith.
1953–1972: Her Majesty Elizabeth the Second, Queen of Ceylon and of Her other Realms and Territories, Head of the Commonwealth.

In her coronation oath, Queen Elizabeth II promised "to govern the Peoples of ... Ceylon ... according to their respective laws and customs". The Standard of Ceylon at the Coronation was borne by Sir Edwin A. P. Wijeyeratne.

List of heads of state

From 1948 to 1972 the head of state of Ceylon was the same person as the Monarch of the United Kingdom. The Governor-General of Ceylon exercised the duties of the head of state.

Monarchs

Governors-General

Problems 
The government of Ceylon had several issues, the main being that the government represented only a small part of the population, mainly wealthy, English-educated elite groups. The Sinhalese and Tamil majority did not share the values and ideas of the upper-class, and this often led to riots.

Economy 

The economy of Ceylon was mainly agriculture-based, with key exports consisting of tea, rubber, and coconuts. These did well in the foreign markets, accounting for 90% of the export share by value. In 1965, Ceylon became the world's leading exporter of tea, with 200,000 tonnes of tea being shipped internationally annually. The exports sold well initially, but falling tea and rubber prices decreased the earnings, with a rapidly increasing population cutting further into those profits. In the early 1970s, the Ceylon government nationalised many privately held assets as part of the newly elected government's socialist policies.

The Land Reform Law of 1972 imposed a maximum of twenty hectares of land that can be owned privately, and sought to reallocate excess land for the benefit of the landless workers. Because land owned by public companies under that was less than ten hectares in size was exempted from the law, a considerable amount of land that would otherwise have been available for redistribution was not subject to the legislation. Between 1972 and 1974, the Land Reform Commission set up by the new laws took over nearly 228,000 hectares, one-third of which was forest and most of the rest planted with tea, rubber, or coconut. Few rice paddies were affected because nearly 95 percent of them were below the ceiling limit. Very little of the land acquired by the government was transferred to individuals. Most was turned over to various government agencies or to cooperative organisations, such as the Up-Country Co-operative Estates Development Board. The Land Reform Law of 1972 applied only to holdings of individuals. It left untouched the plantations owned by joint-stock companies, many of them British. In 1975 the Land Reform (Amendment) Law brought these estates under state control. Over 169,000 hectares comprising 395 estates were taken over under this legislation. Most of this land was planted with tea and rubber. As a result, about two-thirds of land cultivated with tea was placed in the state sector. The respective proportions for rubber and coconut were 32 and 10 percent. The government paid some compensation to the owners of land taken over under both the 1972 and 1975 laws. In early 1988, the state-owned plantations were managed by one of two types of entities, the Janatha Estates Development Board, or the Sri Lanka State Plantation Corporation. Additionally, a revamped system of education created a glut of skilled workers that could not find employment.

Currency 

The official currency of Ceylon was the Ceylon Rupee. The Rupee evolved from the Indian Rupee, when in 1929 a new Ceylon Rupee was formed when it was separated from the Indian Rupee. In 1950, the Currency Board, set up in 1872 as a part of the Indian monetary system, was replaced by the Central Bank of Ceylon, granting the country greater control over the currency. In 1951, the Central Bank of Ceylon took over the issuance of paper money, introducing 1 and 10 rupees notes. These were followed in 1952 by 2, 5, 50 and 100 rupees notes. The 1 rupee notes were replaced by coins in 1963. In 1963, a new coinage was introduced which omitted the monarch's portrait. Coins issued were aluminium 1 and 2 cents, nickel brass 5 and 10 cents and cupro-nickel 25 and 50 cents and 1 rupee. The obverse of the coins issued since 1963 carry the coat of arms. However, until 1966, the Ceylon Rupee remained pegged to the Indian Rupee at a value of 1:1. In 1966, the Ceylon Rupee was pegged to the US Dollar at 4.76 rupees per US Dollar.

Military

Army 

At the end of World War II, the Ceylon Defence Force, the predecessor to the Ceylon Army, began demobilisation. After Independence, Ceylon entered the bi-lateral Anglo-Ceylonese Defence Agreement of 1947. This was followed by Army Act No. 17 of which was passed by Parliament on 11 April 1949, and formalised in Gazette Extraordinary No. 10028 of 10 October 1949. It marked the creation of the Ceylon Army, consisting of a regular and volunteer force, the latter being the successor of the disbanded Ceylon Defence Force. The Defence Agreement of 1947 provided assurance that British would come to the aid of Ceylon in the event it was attacked by a foreign power and provided British military advisers to build the country's military. Brigadier James Sinclair, The Earl of Caithness, was appointed as general officer commanding Ceylon Army, as such becoming the first commander of the Ceylon Army.

Due to a lack of any major external threats, the growth of the army was slow, and the primary duties of the army quickly moved towards internal security by the mid-1950s. The first internal security operation of the Ceylon Army, code-named Operation Monty, began in 1952 to counter the influx of illegal South Indian immigrants brought in by smugglers, in support of Royal Ceylon Navy coastal patrols and police operations. This was expanded and renamed as Task Force Anti-Illicit Immigration (TaFII) in 1963 and continued up to 1981. The Army was mobilised to help the police to restore peace under provincial emergency regulations during the 1953 hartal, the 1956 Gal Oya Valley riots and in 1958 it was deployed for the first time under emergency regulations throughout the island during the 1958 riots.

In 1962 several volunteer officers attempted a military coup, which was stopped hours before it was launched. This attempted coup affected the military to a great extent; since the government mistrusted the military, it reduced the size and growth of the army, especially the volunteer force, with several units being disbanded. In May 1972, Ceylon was proclaimed a republic and changed its name from Ceylon to the "Republic of Sri Lanka", and in 1978 to the "Democratic Socialist Republic of Sri Lanka". All Army units were renamed accordingly.

Navy 

After gaining independence, strategists believed that the navy should be built up and reorganized. The previous navy consisted of the Ceylon Naval Volunteer Force and the Ceylon Royal Naval Volunteer Reserve. On 9 December 1950 the Royal Ceylon Navy was created with the main force consisting of the former Ceylon Royal Naval Volunteer Reserve. The first ship that was commissioned was the HMCyS Vijaya, an Algerine-class minesweeper. During this time the navy took part in several joint naval exercises and a goodwill tour visiting the far east. However, the expansion of the navy was dramatically halted in 1962 when the captain of the navy who was relieved of his duty at the time of the attempted military coup. The navy suffered a great deal as result of the governments retribution that followed, with several of its ships sold off, reduced its size by stoppage of recruitment of officers cadets and sailors for over seven years, the loss of important Bases and Barracks and the stoppage of training in England. As a result, the navy was poorly prepared when in 1971 the 1971 JVP Insurrection began, the navy had to send its sailors for ground combat operations against the insurgents.

In 1972 "Ceylon" became the "Democratic Socialist Republic of Sri Lanka" and the Royal Ceylon Navy became the Sri Lanka Navy. The Naval ensign along with the Flag Officers' flags were redesigned. The term "Captain of the Navy", introduced in the Navy Act, was changed to "Commander of the Navy", in keeping with the terminology adopted by the other two services. Finally, "Her Majesty's Ceylon Ships" (HMCyS) became "Sri Lankan Naval Ships" (SLNS).

During the 1970s the navy began rebuilding its strength with the acquisition of Shanghai class gunboats from China to carry out effective coastal patrolling and carried out several cruises to regional ports.

Air Force 

Early administration and training was carried out by RAF officers and other personnel, who were seconded to the new Royal Ceylon Air Force or RCyAF. The first aircraft of the RCyAF were de Havilland Canada DHC-1 Chipmunks, used as basic trainers. These were followed by Boulton Paul Balliol T.Mk.2s and Airspeed Oxford Mk.1s for advanced training of pilots and aircrew along with de Havilland Doves and de Havilland Herons for transport use, all provided by the British. The closure of British bases in Ceylon in 1956 saw the air force take over former RAF bases; Katunayake and China Bay became RCyAF operational stations while auxiliary functions were carried out at Diyatalawa and Ekala.

In 1959 de Havilland Vampire jet aircraft were acquired. However, the RCyAF did not put them into operational use and soon replaced them with five Hunting Jet Provosts obtained from the British, which were formed into the Jet Squadron.

The Royal Ceylon Air Force first went into combat in 1971 when the Marxist JVP launched an island-wide coup on 5 April. The Ceylon Armed Forces could not respond immediately and efficiently; police stations island-wide and the RCyAF base at Ekala were struck in the initial attacks. Later, the Air Force acquired additional aircraft from the US and the USSR.

Because of a shortage of funds for military expenditure in the wake of the 1971 uprising, the No. 4 Helicopter Squadron began operating commercial transport services for foreign tourists under the name of Helitours. In 1987 the air force had a total strength of 3,700 personnel, including active reserves. The force had grown gradually during its early years, reaching a little over 1,000 officers and recruits in the 1960s. On 31 March 1976, the SLAF was awarded the President's Colour. That same year SLAF detachments, which later became SLAF stations, were established at Wirawila, Vavuniya and Minneriya.

See also 
 Sri Lankan independence movement

References 

States and territories established in 1948
Ceylon
History of Sri Lanka (1948–present)
Sri Lanka and the Commonwealth of Nations
Monarchy in Ceylon
20th century in Ceylon
1948 establishments in Ceylon
1972 disestablishments in Sri Lanka
1972 disestablishments in the British Empire
States and territories disestablished in 1972